Michałowo  is a town in Białystok County, Podlaskie Voivodeship, in north-eastern Poland, close to the border with Belarus. It is the seat of the gmina (administrative district) called Gmina Michałowo. From 1975 to 1998 it was part of Białystok Voivodeship.  

The town has a population of 3,343.

Michałowo received its town rights on 1 January 2009.

In November 2021, several NGOs came to Michałowo to provide humanitarian aid to migrants brought to the Belarusian border east of the town.

References

External links
  

Cities and towns in Podlaskie Voivodeship
Grodno Governorate
Białystok Voivodeship (1919–1939)
Belastok Region